The Kristersson Cabinet (Swedish: Regeringen Kristersson) is the 57th Government of Sweden and is formed by Ulf Kristersson, leader of Moderate Party. It is a coalition government consisting of three parties: the Moderate Party, the Christian Democrats, and the Liberals. The cabinet works closely with the Sweden Democrats, in accordance with the Tidö Agreement backed by a majority in the Riksdag.

Formation 

In the 2022 Swedish general election, the right-wing parliamentary faction consisting of the Sweden Democrats, Moderate Party, Christian Democrats, and Liberals won a slim majority of 176 out of 349 seats. Following a month of negotiations, the Tidö Agreement was signed between the parties. Along with a list of common reforms, the agreement stipulates the parties' intention to govern as a coalition, with the confidence and supply from the Sweden Democrats.

On 17 October 2022, Kristersson was elected Prime Minister of Sweden by the Riksdag following a 176–173 vote. It is the first time the Sweden Democrats exert direct government influence. Some European Union lawmakers criticised the centre-right and the Moderate Party  in particular, as a member of the European People's Party, for allying with the far right, as did Swedish opposition leaders.

Ministers 
Below are the cabinet members listed.

</onlyinclude>

Policy 

The government is set to base their politics on the Tidö Agreement. A specific policy manifesto was presented when Kristersson held his declaration of government (regeringsförklaring) on 18 October 2022.

Notes

References

2022 establishments in Sweden
Cabinets established in 2022
Cabinets of Sweden
Coalition governments
Politics of Sweden
Current governments